The SANS Institute (officially the Escal Institute of Advanced Technologies) is a private U.S. for-profit company founded in 1989 that specializes in information security, cybersecurity training, and selling certificates. Topics available for training include cyber and network defenses, penetration testing, incident response, digital forensics, and auditing. The information security courses are developed through a consensus process involving administrators, security managers, and information security professionals. The courses cover security fundamentals and technical aspects of information security. The institute has been recognized for its training programs and certification programs. Per 2021, SANS is the world’s largest cybersecurity research and training organization. SANS is an acronym for SysAdmin, Audit, Network, and Security.

Programs
The SANS Institute sponsors the Internet Storm Center, an internet monitoring system staffed by a community of security practitioners, and the SANS Reading Room, a research archive of information security policy and research documents. SANS is one of the founding organizations of the Center for Internet Security.

SANS offers news and analysis through Twitter feeds and e-mail newsletters. Additionally, there is a weekly news and vulnerability digest available to subscribers.

Training
When originally organized in 1989, SANS training events functioned like traditional technical conferences showcasing technical presentations.  By the mid-1990s, SANS offered events which combined training with tradeshows. Beginning in 2006, SANS offered asynchronous online training (SANS OnDemand) and a virtual, synchronous classroom format (SANS vLive). Free webcasts and email newsletters (@Risk, Newsbites, Ouch!) have been developed in conjunction with security vendors. The actual content behind SANS training courses and training events remain "vendor-agnostic". Vendors cannot pay to offer their own official SANS course, although they can teach a SANS "hosted" event via sponsorship.

In 1999, the SANS Institute formed Global Information Assurance Certification (GIAC), an independent entity that grants certifications in information security topics.

It has developed and operates NetWars, a suite of interactive learning tools for simulating scenarios such as cyberattacks. NetWars is in use by the US Air Force and the US Army.

Faculty
The majority of SANS faculty are not SANS employees, but industry professionals and experts in the field of information security.  The faculty is organized into six different levels: Mentors, Community, Certified Instructors, Principal Instructors, Senior Instructors, and Fellows.

SANS Technology Institute
 SANS established the SANS Technology Institute, an accredited college based on SANS training and GIAC certifications. On November 21, 2013, SANS Technology Institute was granted regional accreditation by the Middle States Commission on Higher Education.

SANS Technology Institute focuses exclusively on cybersecurity, offering a Master of Science degree program in Information Security Engineering (MSISE), five post-baccalaureate certificate programs (Penetration Testing & Ethical Hacking, Incident Response, Industrial Control Systems, Cyber Defense Operations, and Cybersecurity Engineering (Core), and an upper-division undergraduate certificate program (Applied Cybersecurity).

SANS continues to offer free security content via the SANS Technology Institute Leadership Lab and IT/Security related leadership information.

See also

 Computer security
 Information security
 Information Security Forum
 IT risk

References

External links

SANS Technology Institute
SANS Institute trade name information from Maryland Department of Assessments and Taxation

Computer security organizations
Companies established in 1989